Bosaina is an Egyptian singer, songwriter, producer, art curator, actress, and occasional model best known as the lead vocalist for a number of bands in the Kairo is Koming collective, including Wetrobots, Zuli and Quit Together. She has also pursued a solo project and participated in the Red Bull Music Academy in Tokyo in 2014, and starred in Touchstone Pictures’ first Disney film in the Middle East, The United.

Career
Bosaina has performed with a number of Cairo-based electronic bands, including Wetrobots, ZULI and Quit Together, through her involvement with the groundbreaking Kairo Is Koming collective. Her shows with the collective are often noted for their electric energy, The Guardian stating that her "post-punk party girl attitude, which blends magically with head-banging blonde locks, high-kicks, and catsuits to create a dizzying spell".

She is also an independent music producer and solo performer, releasing her first EP of ambient and jazz-influenced music entitled 'NY, Apr–Jul 2013' in 2013. Becoming a producer was the next logical step in her career, and on a layover back from a SXSW performance in Austin, Texas she decided to stay in New York and enroll at production school Dubspot to develop her debut EP New York, April–July 2013.

Her work has often been controversial in her native Egypt, amidst all the unrest following the country's revolution, where she says she's "been thrown off stage for not wearing enough clothes", and lending her voice and support to the LGBT community.

She has toured extensively, including gigs around Egypt, Lebanon, Germany, Austria, Switzerland, Japan and in the United States at the SXSW Festival.

Other Work
Bosaina ran a Cairo-based fashion school for a number of years, and has worked as a celebrity and editorial stylist internationally. She was also an actress in Touchstone Pictures' first Arab release, The United. Bosaina currently serves as the Art Director/Visual Curator for alternative music space/culture venue VENT.

Discography

EP
 Dirty Bourgeoisie (2011)
 Bang and Blow (2012)
 NY, Apr–Jul 2013 (2013)
 Two Names Upon The Shore (2017)

References

External links
 
 Facebook

Living people
Egyptian singer-songwriters
21st-century Egyptian women singers
Year of birth missing (living people)